"When God-Fearin' Women Get the Blues" is a song written by Leslie Satcher, and recorded by American country music artist Martina McBride.  It was released in June 2001 as the lead-off single to her Greatest Hits compilation album.

Content
The song tells of a female who becomes agitated after getting the blues.

The album version includes a 52-second intro followed by song, which has a playlength of 4:08. The bridge is edited out of the radio version.

McBride chose to include Dan Tyminski as a backing vocalist after hearing him sing "I Am a Man of Constant Sorrow" in the movie O Brother, Where Art Thou? She also said that she enjoyed Leslie Satcher's lyrics in the song, and said that she was laughing the first time she heard Satcher's demo.

Personnel
 Matt Chamberlain — drums
 Jerry Douglas — Dobro
 Larry Franklin — fiddle
 Troy Johnson — background vocals
 B. James Lowry — acoustic guitar
 Martina McBride — lead vocals
 Jerry McPherson — electric guitar
 Steve Nathan — piano
 Dan Tyminski — background vocals
 Biff Watson — acoustic guitar
 Glenn Worf — bass guitar

Music video
The music video was directed by Steven Goldmann and premiered in mid-2001.   It was shot in Bowling Green, Kentucky.

Chart performance
"When God-Fearin' Women Get the Blues" debuted at number 53 on the U.S. Billboard Hot Country Singles & Tracks for the week of June 30, 2001. The song was one of the four tracks from McBride's Greatest Hits compilation that were released as singles. It became a major hit for McBride, peaking within the Country Top 10 at number 8, as well as charting among the Billboard Hot 100, peaking at number 64. The three other singles that would be released ("Blessed," "Where Would You Be," and "Concrete Angel") would also become Top 10 hits on the Billboard Country Chart.

Year-end charts

References

2001 singles
2001 songs
Martina McBride songs
Songs written by Leslie Satcher
Song recordings produced by Paul Worley
RCA Records singles
Music videos directed by Steven Goldmann